{{DISPLAYTITLE:C32H64O2}}
The molecular formula C32H64O2 (molar mass: 480.85 g/mol, exact mass: 480.4906 u) may refer to:

 Cetyl palmitate, or Hexadecyl hexadecanoate
 Lacceroic acid

Molecular formulas